Charles Skelton (April 19, 1806 – May 20, 1879) was an American Democratic Party politician who represented New Jersey's 2nd congressional district in the United States House of Representatives from 1851 to 1855.

Skelton was born in Buckingham Township, Bucks County, Pennsylvania on April 19, 1806. He moved to Trenton, New Jersey about 1829, where he attended the country schools and Trenton Academy. He engaged in mercantile pursuits, and moved to Philadelphia in 1835. He graduated from Jefferson Medical College at Philadelphia in 1838 and commenced the practice of his profession in that city. He returned to Trenton in 1841, and was superintendent of the Trenton Public Schools in 1848.

He was elected as a Democrat to the Thirty-second and Thirty-third Congresses, serving in office from March 4, 1851 to March 3, 1855.

After leaving Congress, he was a member of the common council from 1873-1875. He died in Trenton on May 20, 1879, and was interred in City Cemetery in Hamilton Square, New Jersey.

Skelton's uncle Abraham Doan was a member of the infamous Doan Outlaws, and was executed for his role as a Tory during the American Revolution. Skelton's grandfather Israel Doan was imprisoned for aiding the gang and probably died in jail.

External links

Charles Skelton at The Political Graveyard

References

1806 births
1879 deaths
Physicians from Pennsylvania
Politicians from Philadelphia
Politicians from Trenton, New Jersey

Democratic Party members of the United States House of Representatives from New Jersey
Thomas Jefferson University alumni
19th-century American politicians